Toktogul is a district of Jalal-Abad Region in western Kyrgyzstan. The administrative seat lies at Toktogul.

The town and district are named after its most famous son - the musician Toktogul Satylganov. The Toktogul reservoir is a geographical feature of the district and the capital lies on the north shore.

Geography
The district is located in the southern part of the region within the Naryn river valley. It is bordered by Talas Alatau and Suusamyr Too on the north, At-Oynok Range on the west, and by complex system of mountains: Babash-Ata, Fergana Range and Kekirim-Too on the south. Mountain areas are characterized by highly dissected topography. Absolute elevations of ranges reach 4,165m (Uzun-Akhmat mountains) and 4351 m (Kekirim-Too). The valley is at 650-850 m above sea level. Mountains occupy 93%,  and valley - 7% of the district. The hydrology is dominated by Naryn river, Torkent river, Uzun-Akhmat river, and Kara-Suu river. The Toktogul reservoir and partially Kurpsai reservoir  are respectively in the center and south-west part of the district.

Climate
An average temperature in January is -8°C in valleys, and -12°C in mountains. In July, an average temperature varies from +26°C in valleys, to +8°C in mountains. An absolute recorded temperature minimum was -38° and maximum - +38°. Average yearly precipitation is 400 mm in valleys, and 400-600 mm in mountains. Daily maximum of precipitation can reach 40 mm in valleys and 70 mm in mountains.

Population

Cities, rural communities and villages
In total, Toktogul District includes 1 city and 44 settlements in 10 rural communities. Each rural community can consist of one or several villages. The rural communities and settlements in the Toktogul District are:

 city Toktogul
 Abdy Süyörkulov (seat: Torkent; incl. Kötörmö and Kara-Jygach)
 Aralbaev (seat: Toluk; incl. Almaluu, Noot and Char-Tash)
 Bel-Aldy (seat: Sary-Sögöt; incl. Bel-Aldy and Korgon)
 Cholpon-Ata (seat: Cholpon-Ata; incl. Ak-Tektir, Balykty, Kara-Künggöy, Kushchu-Suu and Mazar-Suu)
 Jangy-Jol (seat: Jangy-Jol; incl. Aral, Kara-Suu, Komsomol, [[Kuybyshev. and Kyzyl-Tuu)
 Ketmen-Döbö (seat: Terek-Suu; incl. Beke-Chal, Chong-Aryk and Eshsay)
 Kyzyl-Özgörüsh (seat: Kyzyl-Özgörüsh; incl. Ang-Aryk, Bel-Kara-Suu, Buurakan, Jar-Tash, Kamysh-Bashy, Kongur-Ögüz, Kosh-Tash, Orto-Jon, Chech-Döbö, Shayyk and Ak-Jar)
 Nichke-Say (seat: Nichke-Say; incl. Chorgochu)
 Sary-Kamysh (seat: Birlik; incl. Kötörmö)
 Üch-Terek (seat: Üch-Terek; incl. Jetigen, Kyzyl-Uraan, Sargata and Taktalyk)

References 

Districts of Jalal-Abad Region